30 Days is a 1999 American independent film written and directed by Aaron Harnick and starring Ben Shenkman and Arija Bareikis. It premiered at the 1999 Toronto International Film Festival on 11 September, and was subsequently released in the United States on 15 September 2000.

Plot
Jordan (Shenkman) is a successful businessman with commitment issues, so friends decided to match him with an NBC worker, Sarah (Bareikis) who is going through some emotional issues. They agree to sleep together after Jordan reveals he doesn't know the name of a woman he recently slept with. But later they decide to become a romantic couple. However, after their first fight, the relationship is over. Jordan later realises how important Sarah is to him and proceeds to try to win her back.

Cast
Ben Shenkman as Jordan Trainer
Arija Bareikis as Sarah Meyers
Alexander Chaplin as Mike Charles
Bradley White as Tad Star
Thomas McCarthy as Brad Drazin
Catherine Kellner as Lauren
Jerry Adler as Rick Trainer
Barbara Barrie as Barbara Trainer
Arden Myrin as Stacey
Mark Feuerstein as Actor
Lisa Edelstein as Danielle
Tina Holmes as Jenny

References

External links
 
 

1999 films
1999 romantic comedy films
American independent films
American romantic comedy films
1990s English-language films
Films shot in New York (state)
1999 independent films
1990s American films